Vaso Subotić (born 29 April 1969) is a Serbian water polo player. He competed in the men's tournament at the 1996 Summer Olympics.

See also
 List of world champions in men's water polo
 List of World Aquatics Championships medalists in water polo

References

External links
 

1969 births
Living people
Serbian male water polo players
Serbia and Montenegro male water polo players
Olympic water polo players of Yugoslavia
Water polo players at the 1996 Summer Olympics
Place of birth missing (living people)